Saint-Privat may refer to:
 , first bishop of Mende
 the Mende Cathedral, officially Basilique-cathédrale Notre-Dame-et-Saint-Privat de Mende

 Places
The following localities, all in France, are named after bishop Privatus of Mende:
 Saint-Privat-de-Champclos in the Gard département
 Saint-Privat-des-Vieux also in the Gard département
 Saint-Privat-d'Allier in the Haute-Loire département
 Saint-Privat-du-Dragon also in the Haute-Loire département
 Saint-Privat-du-Fau in the Lozère département
 Saint-Privat-de-Vallongue also in the Lozère département
 Saint-Privat, Ardèche
 Saint-Privat, Corrèze
 Saint-Privat, Hérault
 Saint-Privat-des-Prés in the Dordogne département
 Aulhat-Saint-Privat in the Puy-de-Dôme département
 Saint-Privat-la-Montagne in the Moselle département
 , former commune in the Moselle département

See also
Saint Privat (band)
Battle of Gravelotte, also known as Battle of Saint-Privat after Saint-Privat-la-Montagne, Moselle